Levomethamphetamine is the levorotatory (L-enantiomer) form of methamphetamine.  Levomethamphetamine is a sympathomimetic vasoconstrictor that is the active ingredient in some over-the-counter (OTC) nasal decongestant inhalers in the United States.

Pharmacology
Levomethamphetamine crosses the blood-brain-barrier and acts as a TAAR1 agonist, functioning as a selective norepinephrine releasing agent (with few or no effects on the release of dopamine), so it affects the central nervous system, although its effects are qualitatively distinct relative to those of dextromethamphetamine. It does not possess the potential for euphoria or addiction that dextromethamphetamine possesses. Among its physiological effects are the vasoconstriction that makes it useful for nasal decongestion. The elimination half-life of levomethamphetamine is between 13.3 and 15 hours, whereas dextromethamphetamine has a half-life of about 10.5 hours.

Selegiline

Levomethamphetamine is an active metabolite of the antiparkinson's drug selegiline. Selegiline, a selective monoamine oxidase B (MAOB) inhibitor at low doses, is also metabolized into levomethamphetamine and levoamphetamine. This has caused users to test positive for amphetamines.

Selegiline itself has neuroprotective and neuro-rescuing effects, but concern over the resulting levomethamphetamine's neurotoxicity led to development of alternative MAOB inhibitors, such as rasagiline, that do not produce toxic metabolites.

Side effects
When the nasal decongestant is taken in excess, levomethamphetamine has potential side effects resembling those of other sympathomimetic drugs; these effects include hypertension (elevated blood pressure), tachycardia (rapid heart rate), nausea, stomach cramps, dizziness, headache, sweating, muscle tension, and tremors. Central side effects may include anxiety, insomnia, and loss of appetite.

Non-medicinal usage
In a study of the psychoactive effects of levomethamphetamine, the intravenous administration of 0.5 mg/kg (but not 0.25 mg/kg) in recreational methamphetamine users produced scores of "drug liking" (pleasure and satisfaction with the drug) similar to racemic methamphetamine, but the effects were shorter lived. The study did not test the oral administration of levomethamphetamine. As of 2006, there were no studies demonstrating "drug liking" scores of oral levomethamphetamine that are similar to racemic methamphetamine or dextromethamphetamine in either recreational users or medicinal users. During the 1900s Methedrine was the brand name for racemic methamphetamine which consisted of a 50:50 mixture of both the levo and dextro enantiomers. 

In recent years, tighter controls in Mexico on certain methamphetamine precursors like ephedrine and pseudoephedrine has led to a greater percentage of illicit meth from Mexican drug cartels consisting of a higher ratio of levomethamphetamine to dextromethamphetamine within batches of racemic meth.

Detection in body fluids 
Levomethamphetamine can register on urine drug screens as either methamphetamine, amphetamine, or both, depending on the subject's metabolism and dosage.  L-methamphetamine metabolizes completely into L-amphetamine after a period of time.

Notes

References 

Methamphetamine
Sympathomimetic amines
Enantiopure drugs
Norepinephrine releasing agents
TAAR1 agonists
VMAT inhibitors